Blue Swords (German: Pokal der Blauen Schwerter) is a senior level international figure skating competition organized in East Germany. Medals were awarded in the disciplines of men's singles, ladies' singles and pair skating.

Men

Ladies

Pairs

Blue Swords
Blue Swords